Charles Alexander Magrath (April 22, 1860 – October 30, 1949) was a Canadian land surveyor and statesman. He conducted foundation surveys of the North-West Territories (NWT) from 1878 until 1885.  He joined Sir Alexander Tilloch Galt and Elliott Torrance Galt in their western industrial enterprises as a surveyor, later becoming Elliott's assistant and Land Commissioner of the North Western Coal and Navigation Company.  He was also the first mayor of Lethbridge, Alberta District, NWT, which has a major street (Mayor Magrath Drive) named after him.

Magrath was a member of the North-West Legislative Assembly from 1891 to 1898. He was appointed as a cabinet minister in the Frederick Haultain administration in 1897. 
In the 1891 and 1894 general elections and an 1897 by-election, he represented Lethbridge and was acclaimed.

Magrath was elected to the House of Commons  representing the Medicine Hat constituency (1908–1911). He was fuel controller during the Great War and chairman of Ontario Hydro and the Canadian section of the International Joint Commission. He also served on the Newfoundland Royal Commission of 1933.

He married Margaret Holmes White Mair in 1887.  After giving birth to a son, Charles Bolton, in 1888, she died in June 1892 of complications following the birth of a daughter.  In 1899, he married Mabel Lillian Galt, a daughter of Sir Alexander and half-sister of Elliot Galt.  Two daughters were born of this union: Amy and Laura.

Magrath has been called "The Father of Irrigation in Southern Alberta".  However, during his lifetime he was quick to acknowledge the contributions of Charles Ora Card, the LDS Church, and Elliot Galt to the development of irrigation in the Lethbridge region. The community of Magrath is named in his honour.

See also
Montague Aldous

External links
 
Charles Alexander Magrath fonds, Library and Archives Canada. 
 

Members of the House of Commons of Canada from Alberta
Conservative Party of Canada (1867–1942) MPs
1860 births
1949 deaths
Members of the Legislative Assembly of the Northwest Territories
History of Lethbridge
Mayors of Lethbridge
Persons of National Historic Significance (Canada)
19th-century Canadian politicians
20th-century Canadian politicians